ICD is the International Statistical Classification of Diseases and Related Health Problems, an international standard diagnostic tool.

ICD may also refer to:

Organizations
 Information Control Division of the US Army in Germany after WWII
 United States Army Medical Research Institute of Chemical Defense (USAMRICD or ICD) 
 Iranian Club, Dubai
 Islamic Corporation for the Development of the Private Sector, of the Islamic Development Bank
 International Clothing Designs, UK clothing importer

Science and technology
 In-circuit debugger, in electronic hardware development
 Interface control document, in systems and software engineering
 MPLAB devices ICD (n-circuit debugger)
 Interatomic Coulombic decay, a relaxation process

Medicine
Intrauterine contraceptive device
Immunogenic cell death
Implantable cardioverter-defibrillator
Impulse control disorder
Isobaric counterdiffusion

Other uses
 Doctor of Canon Law (Latin: Iuris Canonici Doctor)
 Incentive-centered design
 Inland container depot of Container Corporation of India
 Independence Commemorative Decoration (postnominal letters), an award in the Rhodesian honours system

See also
 Intelligence Community Directive 301 (ICD-301)